The 2016 FIL World Luge Championships took place under the auspices of the International Luge Federation at Königssee, Germany from 29 to 31 January 2016.

Schedule
Four events will be held.

Medal summary

Medal table

Medalists

References

External links
Official website

 
2016
FIL World Luge Championships
FIL World Luge Championships
International luge competitions hosted by Germany